The Canadian Museum of Flight (formally the Canadian Museum of Flight Association since 1998) is an aviation museum at the Langley Regional Airport in Langley, British Columbia, Canada. The museum has over 25 civilian and military jets, piston driven engine aircraft, gliders, and helicopters on display, six of which have been restored to flying condition. Other displays include an aviation art gallery and aviation artifacts.

Hampden bomber
The museum's Handley Page Hampden is the last of its type in existence. The aircraft was used in coastal patrol on the BC coast in World War II and crashed offshore in 1942. It was recovered in 1985 and was restored over a twenty-year period. The rare aircraft is stored outdoors, and on 26 December 2008, an especially heavy snowfall broke the left wing spars. This caused the wing to separate from the fuselage.

Collection

Airplanes

Helicopters

Affiliations
The Museum is affiliated with: CMA,  CHIN, and Virtual Museum of Canada.

See also
Organization of Military Museums of Canada
List of aerospace museums
Military history of Canada

References

External links 

Canadian Museum of Flight website

Aviation history of Canada
Aerospace museums in British Columbia
Buildings and structures in Greater Vancouver
Langley, British Columbia (district municipality)